Alycia Moulton won in the final 6–4, 6–2 against Catrin Jexell.

Seeds
A champion seed is indicated in bold text while text in italics indicates the round in which that seed was eliminated.

  Rosalyn Fairbank (first round)
  Marcella Mesker (semifinals)
  Alycia Moulton (champion)
  Kate Latham (first round)
  Barbara Hallquist (first round)
  Vicki Nelson (second round)
  Patricia Medrado (second round)
  Terry Phelps (second round)

Draw

External links
 1983 Ridgewood Open Draw

Singles